Luigi Bosatra (8 August 1905 – 16 February 1981) was an Italian athlete who competed in racewalking in the 1924 Summer Olympics.

Biography
In 1924 he finished eighth in the 10 km competition at the Paris Games.

Achievements

See also
Italy at the 1924 Summer Olympics

References

External links
 

1905 births
1981 deaths
Italian male racewalkers
Olympic athletes of Italy
Athletes (track and field) at the 1924 Summer Olympics
20th-century Italian people